Mpassa  is a department of Haut-Ogooué Province in south-eastern Gabon. The capital is Franceville. It had a population of 129,694 in 2013.

Towns and villages

See also
 Central Africa

References

Haut-Ogooué Province
Departments of Gabon